GhanaSat-1 was the first Ghanaian nanosatellite to be launched into space. It was designed and built in two years in conjunction with the Kyushu Institute of Technology Birds-1 program, which has the goal of helping countries build their first satellite.

The satellite took images, collected atmospheric data, measured space radiation, and transmitted uploaded audio. GhanaSat-1 was launched to the International Space Station (ISS) on a Falcon 9 rocket. It was released into space from the Nanoracks CubeSat Deployer on the ISS on 7 July 2017 and was used to monitor environmental activities along Ghana's coastline. The satellite deorbited on 22 May 2019.

Background 
Ghana through All Nations University is a private university in Ghana to build the first Ghana satellite named Ghanasat-1. The Ghanasat-1 was developed by three engineers namely Benjamin Bonsu, Ernest Matey, Joseph Quansah. The Ghana Team led by Benjamin Bonsu joined the Joint Global Multi-Nation Birds satellite program, supported by Kyushu Institute of Technology (KIT) of Japan, which is a cross-border interdisciplinary satellite project for non-spacefaring countries. The Birds-1 Project included four guest countries: Ghana, Mongolia, Nigeria, and Bangladesh. GhanaSat-1  is the first Ghanaian's first satellite launched into orbit, entirely funded by the All Nations University. This big achievement makes All Nations University, Africa's first private university to launch a satellite into orbit.

Design and development 
GhanaSat-1 was assembled and tested by three students at All Nations University. The five 1U CubeSats, four built by the guest countries and one by Kyushu Institute of Technology (Japan), were all identical in their design. The two-year period spanning the development, construction, launch and operation of the satellites engaged three university students from each of the five participating countries. The satellite cost about US$500,000 to manufacture and launch.

Power was generated from solar cells and stored in batteries. The satellite was cube-shaped and measured  on each side. The satellite carried low- and high-resolution cameras that took pictures of Ghana and monitored the country's coastline. The satellite had the ability to receive requested songs from the ground and transmit them from space; the national anthem of Ghana was one of the songs broadcast in orbit. Finally, the satellite measured the effects of radiation in space on commercial microprocessors.

GhanaSat-1 was given to the Japan Aerospace Exploration Agency (JAXA) on 9 February 2017, and was then transferred to the National Aeronautics and Space Administration (NASA) on 12 February 2017. The GhanaSat-1 Birds designation is Bird GG.

Mission

Launch 
SpaceX launched the satellite on its CRS-11 mission to the International Space Station on 3 June 2017. The satellite was carried in a Dragon spacecraft on a Falcon 9 rocket, launched from NASA's Kennedy Space Center, LC-39A. This was the 100th launch from LC-39A and the first time SpaceX reused one of its Dragon capsules. This mission also carried CubeSats from Japan, Bangladesh, Nigeria, and Mongolia. The satellites from Bangladesh (BRAC Onnesha) and Mongolia (Mazaalai) are those countries first satellites.

GhanaSat-1 was released by a Japanese astronaut from the Nanoracks CubeSat Deployer, located in the Japanese Kibō module of the International Space Station, on 7 July 2017. The satellite launch was broadcast live and watched by over 400 people at All Nations University.

Operations 
The satellite was primarily a technology demonstrator and Earth observation satellite. The Ghana scientists took images of the Ghanaian coastline for cartography. The director of Space Systems Technology Laboratory at All Nations University, Richard Damoah, said the satellite would "...also help us train the upcoming generation on how to apply satellites in different activities around our region. For instance, monitoring illegal mining is one of the things we are looking to accomplish". The satellite communicated with seven ground stations: one in each of the countries participating in the Birds-1 program, and one each in Thailand and Taiwan. The satellite was the last of the Birds-1 group to deorbit, ending its mission 22 May 2019.

Future work 
The university plans to coordinate with the government to build GhanaSat-2 and GhanaSat-3. The primary objective of GhanaSat-2 is to monitor water pollution, illegal mining, and deforestation. Japan's work with non-spacefaring countries continues with the Philippines, Bhutan, and Malaysia through Birds-2, launched in 2018 along with SpaceX CRS-15.

References

External links 
 Official Birds website

2017 in Ghana
Satellites orbiting Earth
CubeSats
First artificial satellites of a country
Science and technology in Ghana
Spacecraft launched in 2017
Student satellites
Satellites deployed from the International Space Station
Spacecraft which reentered in 2019